Richard Tufton, 5th Earl of Thanet (30 May 1640 or 1641 – 8 March 1684),  styled The Honourable Richard Tufton until 1680, was an English nobleman.

Tufton was the third son of John Tufton, 2nd Earl of Thanet and Lady Margaret, daughter of Richard Sackville, 3rd Earl of Dorset and Lady Anne Clifford. Through his father, he was a great-great-grandson of Lord Burghley. He sat as Member of Parliament for Appleby from 1679 to 1680, when he succeeded his elder brother John Tufton, 4th Earl of Thanet in the earldom and entered the House of Lords. He also inherited the office of High Sheriff of Westmorland (1680–1684).

Lord Thanet died unmarried in March 1684 and was succeeded in his titles by his younger brother, Thomas.

References

1640s births
Year of birth uncertain
1684 deaths
17th-century English nobility
Tufton, Richard
High Sheriffs of Westmorland
People from Appleby-in-Westmorland
Place of birth missing
English MPs 1680–1681
Earls of Thanet
Barons de Clifford